Jedediah or Jedidiah is a Hebrew male given name, which is derived from the name Yedidyah, meaning "beloved of Jah". In the Hebrew Bible, Jedidiah (Jeddedi in Brenton's Septuagint Translation) was the second or "blessing" name given by God through the prophet Nathan in infancy to Solomon, second son of King David and Bathsheba.

The name may also refer to:

People
Jedediah Berry (born 1977), American writer
Jedediah Bila (born 1979), American writer and commentator
Jedediah Buxton (1707–1772), English mathematician
Jedediah Slason Carvell (1832–1894), Canadian businessman and politician
Jedediah Dupree (born 1979), American fencer and fencing coach
Jedediah Foster (1726–1779), American judge
Jedediah M. Grant (1816–1856), American religious leader
Jedediah Herrick (1780–1847), American general 
Jedediah Hinkle, American politician
Jedediah Hotchkiss (1828–1899), American educator and topographer
Jedediah Huntington (1743–1818), American general
Jedediah Vincent Huntington (1815–1862), American clergyman and novelist
Jedidiah Morse (1761–1826), American geographer
Jedidiah Norzi (1560–1626), Italian rabbi
Jedediah Peck (1748–1821), American politician
Jedediah Purdy (born 1974), American law professor and writer
Jedediah Sanger (1751-1829), American politician
Jedediah Smith (1799–1831), American trader and explorer
Jedediah K. Smith (1770–1828), American politician
Jedidiah Strutt (1726–1797), English inventor

Fiction
 Jedediah, fictional cowboy diorama piece, played by Owen Wilson in Night at the Museum
 Jedediah Leland, fictional character played by Joseph Cotten in the film Citizen Kane
 Jedediah Cooper, fictional main character in the film Hang 'Em High
 Jedediah the Pilot in Mad Max Beyond Thunderdome
 Jedediah Shine, fictional police officer in UK TV series Ripper Street
 Levi Jedediah Calder, one of the main characters of novel Unwind
 Jedidiah Sawyer, a character known as Leatherface in The Texas Chainsaw Massacre film franchise

See also
Jed (given name)
Yedidia, a variant

References

English masculine given names
Hebrew masculine given names
People whose existence is disputed